Ripalimosani is a comune (municipality) in the Province of Campobasso in the Italian region Molise, located about  north of Campobasso.

Ripalimosani borders the following municipalities: Campobasso, Castropignano, Limosano, Matrice, Montagano, Oratino.

Twin towns
 Borgo Tossignano, Italy

Notable people

Paolo Nicola Giampaolo (1757–1832), Italian cleric and agronomist

References

Cities and towns in Molise